The 2017 Copa Chile, (officially known as Copa Chile MTS 2017 because of its sponsorship), was the 38th edition of the Copa Chile, the country's national cup tournament. The competition started on 9 July 2017 with the First Round and ended on 11 November 2017. Santiago Wanderers were the winners, beating Universidad de Chile 3–1 in the final to win their third title and first since 1961, and qualified for the 2018 Copa Libertadores.

Format 
The 2017 Copa Chile is based on a system of direct elimination with double-legged ties, similar to the Copa del Rey. All participating teams start the competition in the first round, with the 16 Primera B teams being drawn against the 16 Primera División teams.

Prizes 
The champions of this edition earned the right to compete in the 2018 Copa Libertadores as Chile 3 (qualifying to the second round of the continental tournament). Besides, they also earned the right to play the 2018 Supercopa de Chile. The runners-up would be able to qualify for the 2018 Copa Sudamericana, taking the Chile 4 berth for that tournament, however, since runners-up Universidad de Chile had already qualified for the Copa Libertadores, the Copa Sudamericana berth was passed to the league.

Schedule

First round
The first legs were played on 9–22 July, and the second legs will be played on 21–23 July and 2–9 August 2017.

|}

First leg

Second leg

Bracket

Round of 16
The draw for the Round of 16 (and subsequent phases) was held on 7 July 2017. Starting from this round, the order of legs in each tie will depend on the number assigned to the first round tie won by each team. The team with the highest number in each tie will host the second leg.

|}

Notes

First leg

Second leg

Quarterfinals
The schedule was released on 7 September. Matches were played from 13 September to 9 October.

|}

First leg

Second leg

Semifinals
Matches were played from 18 to 25 October.

|}

First leg

Second leg

Final
On 26 October 2017, the ANFP announced that the Copa Chile Final would be played on 11 November 2017 in Concepción.

Top goalscorers

References

External links
 Official site of the Copa Chile 

Chile
2017
Copa Chile